Berrington railway station was a railway station on the Severn Valley line serving the village of Berrington, Shropshire. It opened in 1862 with a single platform and a siding. By 1894 it had acquired an additional platform along with a signal box and the sidings had been expanded. Despite the name it was actually closer to the neighbouring village of Cross Houses. Although thought by some people to have been closed as part of the Beeching axe in 1963 its planned closure pre-dated his report. The station and its buildings now house a private dwelling and small businesses.

References

Further reading

Disused railway stations in Shropshire
Railway stations in Great Britain opened in 1862
1862 establishments in England
Former Great Western Railway stations
Railway stations in Great Britain closed in 1963